The Commander-in-Chief, Portsmouth, was a senior commander of the Royal Navy for hundreds of years. The commanders-in-chief were based at premises in High Street, Portsmouth from the 1790s until the end of Sir Thomas Williams's tenure, his successor, Sir Philip Durham, being the first to move into Admiralty House at the Royal Navy Dockyard, where subsequent holders of the office were based until 1969. Prior to World War I the officer holder was sometimes referred to in official dispatches as the Commander-in-Chief, Spithead.

The Command extended along the south coast from Newhaven in East Sussex to Portland in Dorset. In 1889 the Commander-in-Chief took  as his flagship.

History

In the late 18th century port admirals began to reside ashore, rather than on board their flagships; the Commander-in-Chief, Portsmouth was provided with a large house at 111 High Street, which was renamed Admiralty House (and which had formerly been home to the Mayor of Portsmouth). In the 1830s Admiralty House was sold to the War Office (as Government House, it went on to house the Lieutenant-Governor of Portsmouth for the next fifty years). The Commander-in-Chief moved in turn into the former Dockyard Commissioner's house, which still stands within HMNB Portsmouth.

During the Second World War the Command Headquarters was at Fort Southwick. Rear Admiral Lancelot Holland, commanding the 3rd Battle Squadron, was briefly tasked also to command the Channel Force, operating from Portland Harbour in September-October 1939, within the Portsmouth command boundaries but responsible directly to the Admiralty. Operation Aerial, the evacuation from western French ports in 1940, was commanded by Admiral William Milbourne James, the Commander-in-Chief. James lacked the vessels necessary for convoys and organised a flow of troopships, storeships and motor vehicle vessels from Southampton, coasters to ply from Poole and the Dutch schuyts to work from Weymouth, while such warships as were available patrolled the shipping routes. Demolition parties sailed in the ships but it was hoped that supplies and equipment could be embarked as well as troops.

During World War II several subordinate commanders along the coast were appointed: Flag Officer-in-Charge Southampton, 1942-45; a Captain as Naval Officer-in-Charge Weymouth, 1941-43; Naval Officer-in-Charge Newhaven, 1942-44, held by two retired vice-admirals; and Commander C.B. Hastings RN (retired) as Naval Officer-in-Charge Poole, 1940-44. However operational control of the various Coastal Forces flotillas was the responsibility of the local area commander-in-chief rather than Rear-Admiral Coastal Forces. Later in the war Coastal Forces HQ was moved to North London.

In 1952 the Commander-in-Chief took up the NATO post of Commander-in-Chief, Channel (CINCHAN). This move added Allied Command Channel to the NATO Military Command Structure. The admiral commanding at Portsmouth had control naval operations in the area since 1949 under WUDO auspices.

The post of Commander-in-Chief, Portsmouth, was merged with that of Commander-in-Chief, Plymouth, in 1969 to form the post of Commander-in-Chief, Naval Home Command. The posts of Second Sea Lord and Commander-in-Chief Naval Home Command were amalgamated in 1994 following the rationalisation of the British Armed Forces following the end of the Cold War.

Units and formations 
Considered as the most prestigious of the home commands, the Commander-in-Chief was responsible for the central part of the English Channel between Newhaven and the Isle of Portland. Below is a list of units that served under this command.

The Commander-in-Chief had a Chief of Staff serving under him from 1832–1969.

Senior officers included:

Flotillas and squadrons 
Included:

Shore establishments 
Included:

Commanders-in-Chief 
Post holder have included:
  = died in post

 Rear Admiral Sir Robert Holmes April 1667–October 1667
Captain, John Graydon, January – February 1695
 Captain James Wishart, February – April 1695
 Commodore Basil Beaumont: February–March 1698
 Rear Admiral Henry Houghton: March–July 1698
 Commodore Thomas Warren: December 1698 
 Rear Admiral James Wishart, September 1703 – October 1703
Commodore Richard Lestock, 1741 
 Admiral James Steuart: 1745–1747
 Admiral Sir Edward Hawke: 1748–1752
 Admiral Sir Edward Hawke: 1755–1756
 Admiral Henry Osborn: 1756–1757
 Admiral Sir Francis Holburne 1758–1766
 Admiral Sir John Moore: 1766–1769
 Admiral Sir Francis Geary 1769–1771
 Admiral Thomas Pye: 1771–1774
 Admiral Sir James Douglas: 1774–1777 
 Admiral Thomas Pye: 1777–1783 
 Admiral John Montagu: 1783–1786
 Admiral Viscount Hood: 1786–1789 
 Admiral Robert Roddam: 1789–1792
 Admiral Viscount Hood: 1792–1793 
 Admiral Sir Peter Parker: 1793–1799 
 Admiral Mark Milbanke: 1799–1803
 Admiral Lord Gardner: March – June 1803 
 Admiral Sir George Montagu: 1803–1809 
 Admiral Sir Roger Curtis: 1809–1812
 Admiral Sir Richard Bickerton: 1812–1815
 Admiral Sir Edward Thornbrough: 1815–1818
 Admiral Sir George Campbell: 1818–1821 
 Admiral Sir James Hawkins-Whitshed: 1821–1824
 Admiral Sir George Martin: 1824–1827
 Admiral Sir Robert Stopford: 1827–1830
 Admiral Sir Thomas Foley: 1830–1833 
 Admiral Sir Thomas Williams: 1833–1836
 Admiral Sir Philip Durham: 1836 – March 1839
 Admiral Charles Elphinstone Fleeming: April – November 1839
 Admiral Sir Edward Codrington: 1839–1842
 Admiral Sir Charles Rowley: 1842–1845
 Admiral Sir Charles Ogle: 1845–1848 
 Admiral Sir Thomas Capel: 1848–1851 
 Admiral Sir Thomas Briggs: 1851–1852 
 Admiral Sir Thomas Cochrane: 1852–1856 
 Admiral Sir George Seymour: 1856–1859 
 Admiral Sir William Bowles: 1859–1860 
 Admiral Sir Henry W. Bruce: March 1860 – March 1863
 Admiral Sir Michael Seymour: March 1863 – March 1866
 Admiral Sir Thomas Pasley, Bt.: March 1866 – February 1869
 Admiral Sir James Hope: February 1869 – March 1872
 Admiral Sir Rodney Mundy: March 1872 – March 1875
 Admiral Sir George A. Elliot: March 1875 – March 1878
 Admiral Edward G Fanshawe: March 1878 – November 1879
 Admiral Alfred Ryder: November 1879 – November 1882
 Admiral Sir Geoffrey Hornby: November 1882 – November 1885
 Admiral Sir George Willes: November 1885 – June 1888
 Admiral Sir John Commerell: June 1888 – June 1891
 Admiral the Earl of Clanwilliam: June 1891 – June 1894
 Admiral Sir Nowell Salmon: June 1894 – August 1897
 Admiral Sir Michael Culme-Seymour, Bt.: August 1897 – October 1900
 Admiral Sir Charles Hotham: October 1900 – August 1903
 Admiral Sir John Fisher: August 1903 – March 1904
 Admiral Sir Archibald Douglas: March 1904 – March 1907
 Admiral Sir Day Bosanque: March 1907 – March 1908
 Admiral Sir Arthur Fanshawe: March 1908 – April 1910
 Admiral the Hon. Sir Assheton Curzon-Howe: April 1910 – March 1911 
 Admiral Sir Arthur Moore: March 1911 – July 1912
 Admiral of the Fleet the Hon. Sir Hedworth Meux: July 1912 – March 1916
 Admiral the Hon. Sir Stanley Colville: March 1916 – March 1919
 Admiral Sir Cecil Burney: March 1919 – April 1920
 Admiral the Hon. Sir Somerset Gough-Calthorpe: April 1920 – April 1923
 Admiral Sir Sydney Fremantle: April 1923 – April 1926
 Admiral Sir Osmond Brock: April 1926 – April 1929
 Admiral of the Fleet Sir Roger Keyes, Bt.: April 1929 – May 1931
 Admiral Sir Arthur Waistell: June 1931 – January 1934
 Admiral Sir John Kelly: January 1934 – July 1936
 Admiral Sir William Fisher: July 1936 – June 1937 
 Admiral of the Fleet The Earl of Cork and Orrery: July 1937 – June 1939
 Admiral Sir William James: June 1939 – October 1942
 Admiral Sir Charles Little: October 1942 – February 1945
 Admiral Sir Geoffrey Layton: March 1945 – May 1947
 Admiral The Lord Fraser of North Cape: May 1947 – July 1948
 Admiral of the Fleet Sir Algernon Willis: July 1948 – September 1950 
 Admiral of the Fleet Sir Arthur Power: September 1950 – September 1952
 Admiral Sir John Edelsten: September 1952 – September 1954
 Admiral of the Fleet Sir George Creasy: September 1954 – July 1957
 Admiral Sir Guy Grantham: July 1957 – March 1959
 Admiral Sir Manley Power: March 1959 – October 1961
 Admiral Sir Alexander Bingley: October 1961 – February 1963
 Admiral Sir Wilfrid Woods: February 1963 – August 1965
 Admiral Sir Varyl Begg: August 1965 – March 1966
 Admiral Sir Frank Hopkins: March 1966 – November 1967
 Admiral Sir John Frewen: November 1967 – 1969

References

P
Military units and formations of the Royal Navy in World War I
Military units and formations disestablished in 1969
Military units and formations of the Royal Navy in World War II
Military history of the English Channel